The Fools' Hall of Fame is the title of an American song. There has been more than one composition using this title.

Versions
In 1957 the composition written by Danny Wolfe was recorded by Rudi Richardson on the Sun label in an R&B style. Shortly it was also recorded by both Roy Orbison and Johnny Cash on the same label, but not released. This song has become an early R&R classic mainly because of Roy's reissue, although it had never charted.

In 1959 Pat Boone recorded a different composition by Aaron Schroeder and Wally Gold, as a Pop ballad. It charted at #29 US.

In 1962 Paul Anka wrote a third composition which he released, an uptempo Pop song.

American songs